The 1935–36 Copa México was the 19th staging of this Mexican football cup competition that existed from 1907.

The competition started on June 7, 1936 and concluded on June 28, 1936 in which Necaxa lifted the trophy for fourth time after a 2–1 victory over Asturias.

Preliminary round

Final phase

References
Mexico - Statistics of Copa México in season 1935/1936. (RSSSF)

Copa Mexico, 1935-36
Copa MX
Copa